= Jacob A. Eaton =

American politician (1871–1921)

Jacob Aaron Eaton (1871–1921) was an American politician in Rhode Island. He served in the Rhode Island House of Representatives for eleven years between 1910 and 1921. He was Jewish.

Eaton was born in Romania in 1871. He was a founding member of the Touro Guards fraternity. In 1908, he was clerk of the Committee on Corporations.

He sponsored an "Americanization Bill" to teach immigrants to read, write, and speak English.

== See also ==
- Harry Cutler (politician), an immigrant Jewish state legislator in Rhode Island who preceded Eaton in the Rhode Island House
