= Harry Cutler (politician) =

Rhode Island politician and military officer

Harry Cutler (1875-August 27, 1920) was an immigrant, military officer, and politician in the United States. He served in the Rhode Island House of Representatives from 1908-1911. He represented Providence. He was Jewish. He died in London.

He was born in Czarist Russia. He immigrated to the U.S. as a child and got into the jewelry business.

He received a Distinguished Service Medal as a civilian for meritorious service during World War I. He chaired the Jewish Welfare Board.

The Cutler Jewelry and Comb Company was at 7 Eddy Street in Providence. He was a delegate to the Republican National Convention in 1912.
